The Suzuki Raider 150 or Suzuki Satria 150 and Suzuki Belang R150 in Malaysia uses the  DOHC four-valve single-cylinder engine based from Suzuki FXR150, with a six-speed transmission. The frame, rear swing arm, rear suspension, seat and front brakes are redesigned from the Suzuki FX125 chassis, making it more aerodynamic.

The main features are full-length front shock, rear monoshock suspension, six-speed short gear ratio transmission, dual camshaft engine, lightweight chassis construction, alloy cast wheel, large-diameter front disc brake, and a rear disc brake, which is rarely found in underbones.

First Generation (2003)

2003–2008
The first generation Suzuki Raider R150 was assembled in Thailand together with the closely related Raider 125. It has the similarities with the DOHC oil-cooled carbureted engine from FXR150 from Malaysia and also changed the carburettor to a 26 mm, originally 29 mm carburettor size and the power was detuned from 20 PS to 16,5 PS. Suzuki then redesigned the FX125 chassis and made it on an underbone category. The Raider R150 was launched in 2004 in the Philippines, also in Indonesia as Satria F150 replacing 2-stroke Satria 120R, this model was exported from Thailand to other markets in South East Asia. Due to its popularity, this model was also assembled in Indonesia (CKD) starting from 2007.

2008–2013

In 2008, the Raider got its first facelift and moved the assembling completely to Indonesia. Suzuki Raider 150R got a slight makeover in its design, the most notable change was headlight has changed inspired by that of the GSX-R600/750 superbikes. The Raider 150 was released in 2009 for the Malaysian market as the Suzuki Belang R150 until 2016. The Raider R150 was released in 2013 for the Vietnamese market.

2013–2016
The second facelift arrived in 2013 with new bodywork on the headlights and sharper body style. In 2015, the model got reworked to meet the Euro-3 emission standard. This model also produced in Philippines and as of its present day, and the model are still available along with the new FI model.

Second Generation (2016)
The second generation Raider 150 was introduced in 2016, with totally new design, new digital speedometer, LED headlights, reworked engine with fuel-injection and with liquid-cooled cooling system. This engine also shared with the GSX-R150, albeit with different gear ratios in the transmission, different injectors and different tuning in the ECM. This generation also assembled with CKD kits from Indonesia in Vietnam as Raider 150 and sold together with the fully imported Indonesian built Satria 150.

Specifications

References

External links
 Specification Satria 150cc
 Official Suzuki Indonesia website
 Official Suzuki Philippines website
 Official Suzuki Malaysia website

Raider 150
Motorcycles introduced in 2002